The 2008 All-Ireland Senior Camogie Championship Final was the 77th All-Ireland Final and the deciding match of the 2008 All-Ireland Senior Camogie Championship, an inter-county camogie tournament for the top teams in Ireland.

Cork won their third title in four years after Galway missed several goal chances. Síle Burns scored both Rebelette goal.

References

Camogie
All-Ireland Senior Camogie Championship Final
All-Ireland Senior Camogie Championship Final, 2008
All-Ireland Senior Camogie Championship Finals
Cork county camogie team matches